Nikunau Airport  is the airport serving Nikunau, Kiribati. It is located on the western tip of the atoll.

The airport is served by Air Kiribati from Beru Airport on Beru Island, from which flights to Bonriki International Airport in Tarawa are available.

Airlines and destinations

Airports in Kiribati